Robert Cunningham Ayrault (born April 27, 1966) is an American former professional baseball right-handed pitcher, having played for two Major League Baseball (MLB) teams.

An alumnus of the University of Nevada, Las Vegas, Ayrault would make his MLB debut with the Philadelphia Phillies on June 7, 1992, against the St. Louis Cardinals, at Veterans Stadium, in Philadelphia; his last MLB appearance was for the Seattle Mariners, on July 25, 1993, on the road, versus the Cleveland Indians (at Cleveland Stadium). Although he pitched minor league ball for a few more seasons, his major league career was over at only age 27.

External links

Bob Ayrault at Baseball Almanac

1966 births
Living people
Acereros de Monclova players
Albuquerque Dukes players
American expatriate baseball players in Canada
American expatriate baseball players in Mexico
Baseball players from California
Batavia Clippers players
Calgary Cannons players
Edmonton Trappers players
Grays Harbor Gulls players
Major League Baseball pitchers
Major League Baseball replacement players
Mexican League baseball pitchers
Moorpark Raiders baseball players
People from South Lake Tahoe, California
Philadelphia Phillies players
Reading Phillies players
Reno Chukars players
Reno Silver Sox players
Scranton/Wilkes-Barre Red Barons players
Seattle Mariners players
UNLV Rebels baseball players